Barber Steamship Lines was founded in 1902 as Barber & Company Inc. and also operated the New York & Oriental Steamship Company.  In 1928 Barber Steamship Lines operated the American West African Line.  In 1945 Barber Steamship Lines was renamed the Wilhelmsen Lines, as it was acquired by Wilh. Wilhelmsen, a Norwegian company, later was renamed again to Barber International.  American West African Line was closed in 1946, now part of Barber Steamship Lines. Barber Steamship Lines operated in the Far East and then around the World with Wilh. Wilhelmsen ships. Barber Steamship Lines also operated ships of British James Chambers & Company (1945 to 1955),  Norwegian Fearnley & Eger Company and A. F. Klaveness & Co.

American West African Line
During World War II the American West African Line was active with charter shipping with the Maritime Commission and War Shipping Administration. After World War II American West African Line purchased some of the low-cost surplus ships. During wartime, the American West African Line line operated Victory ships and Liberty ships.

Ships
Ship of Barber Steamship Lines and American West African Line: 
SS West Humhaw
 SS Cathlamet
 SS Challenger
 SS City of New York
 SS West Irmo Sank 1942 Uboat  
 SS Otho
 SS Sagadahoc
 SS West Cawthon
 SS West Cusseta
 SS West Humhaw
 SS West Irmo 	
 SS West Isleta
 SS West Kebar
 SS West Lashaway Sank by German submarine U-66.
 SS Zarembo
 SS Stephen Smith
SS Wesley W. Barrett
 SS George Ade
SS John Carter Rose
 SS Jared Ingersoll
SS Thomas Stone
SS Cedar Rapids Victory
 SS Coastal Competitor
 SS Felix Riesenberg
 SS Belgium Equity
SS Radcliffe Victory
 SS West Kedron
Empire Gazelle
 SS Taos Victory 
 SS Westbrook Victory
 SS Westerly Victory
 SS Zanesville Victory
 SS Drury Victory
 SS Escanaba Victor
Richard Bland
Richard D. Spaight
Harvard Victory 
Felix Riesenberg
Frank Adair Monroe
Benjamin H. Bristow 
Bushrod Washington 
James A. Farrell
James K. Polk
James M. Goodhue
Jared Ingersoll
Jeremiah M. Daily
Jeremiah Wadsworth
Thomas Hooker
Vernon L. Parrington
John R. McQuigg
Edward L. Grant
Julia Ward Howe
Oakley Wood
Arthur P. Davis
 SS Matt W. Ransom
 SS West Nohno
SS Empire Eland

 Bigorange XVIII
 Bigorange XVIII
 Danae
 Franconia
 Talnati
 Tamesis
 Tamesis
 Taronga
 Tender
 Champion
 Themis
 Tourcoing
 Tourcoing
 Tønsberg
 Tønsberg
 MV Taiko
 MV Tricolor
MV Tampa

References

Defunct shipping companies of the United States
Transport companies established in 1903